This is a list of international presidential trips made by Zuzana Čaputová, the fifth president of the Slovak republic, since her inauguration on 15 June 2019.

Since June 2019, she has visited these countries:

 1 visit: Denmark, Israel, Japan, Vatican City, Slovenia, Latvia, United Arab Emirates, Moldova, Italy, Spain, Greece, North Macedonia, Malta, Egypt
 2 visits: Hungary, Ukraine, Switzerland, United States, France
3 visits: Austria, Belgium, United Kingdom
 5 visits: Germany, Poland
 8 visits: Czech Republic

List

2019

2020

2021

2022

References 

Čaputová
Čaputová